Residential Tenancies Act may refer to legislation in various jurisdictions:

 Residential Tenancies Act (Alberta)
 Residential Tenancies Act, 2006 for the Ontario law